Fabien Rohrer (born 1 September 1975) is a Swiss snowboarder. He competed in the men's halfpipe event at the 1998 Winter Olympics.

References

1975 births
Living people
Swiss male snowboarders
Olympic snowboarders of Switzerland
Snowboarders at the 1998 Winter Olympics
Sportspeople from Bern